Jorge Rolando Pereyra Díaz (born 5 August 1990) is an Argentine professional footballer who plays as a striker for Indian Super League club Mumbai City.

Club career

Ferro Carril Oeste
Pereyra Díaz began his professional career with Primera B Nacional club Ferro Carril Oeste.

Lanus
On 5 March 2013, he signed with Lanús. He made his debut with 'Granate' on 13 April 2013, as a substitute, in a league match where Lanus beat All Boys 2–1. Pereyra Díaz' first start came a few days later, on April 17, in a Copa Argentina match against Atlético Rafaela. With Lanús, he helped them win the 2013 Copa Sudamericana, being in the starting lineup in the first leg final against Ponte Preta.

Johor Darul Ta'zim

2014
Pereyra Díaz signed a three-year contract with Malaysia Super League team Johor Darul Ta'zim in May 2014. The transfer fee was rumoured to be US$2 million. He made his debut as a substitute in the first leg of the Malaysia FA Cup semi final against Pahang FA. On 20 May 2014, he scored a brace to help Johor Darul Takzim came back from 0–2 down to win 3–2 against LionsXII at Stadium Jalan Besar. He finished the season with 15 goals in 29 league appearances.

2015
During the 2015 season, he scored two goals against Ayeyawady United in a 5–0 victory during the AFC Cup. On 12 July 2015, Pereyra Díaz was loaned out to Independiente.

Independiente (loan)
Pereyra Díaz only made seven league appearances for Independiente. After his four months loan spell, he returned to JDT.

2016
After his loan spell with Independiente, Pereyra Díaz returned to JDT for the 2016 Malaysia Super League season. On 2 February 2016, he made his 2016 debut during the 2016 AFC Champions League qualifying play-off against Muangthong United, where JDT were defeated 0–3 on penalties with Diaz missing the first penalty. He made his 2016 Malaysia Super League debut in a 1–1 draw against Selangor FA, where JDT lifted their third Sultan Haji Ahmad Shah Cup after winning on penalties (7–6 p). On 16 February 2016, Pereyra Díaz scored his first Malaysia Super League goal of the season in a 2–0 victory against T-Team F.C. He also contributed a goal and 2 assist during JDT's 8–1 victory against Ayeyawady United in the 2016 AFC Cup group stage.

Club León (loan)
On 21 January 2017, Jorge Pereyra Díaz joined Liga MX club Club León on loan from JDT. Pereyra Díaz made his debut for the club against Atlas F.C. coming on as substitute in the 59th minute for Germán Cano. On 13 August 2017, Pereyra Díaz scored his first goal for the club against Club Necaxa.

2018
Pereyra Díaz returned to JDT after his loan spell with León. On 3 February 2018, Pereyra Díaz made his 2018 Malaysia Super League debut in a 2–1 victory against Kedah Darul Aman FC. On 6 February 2018, Pereyra Díaz scored his first goal of the 2018 season against Perak FA II. On 9 May 2018, Pereyra Díaz terminated his contract with JDT.

Return to Lanus
On 23 May 2018, Pereyra Díaz returned to his former club Atlético Lanús for the 2018–19 Argentine Primera División.

Bolívar
On 30 December 2018, Pereyra Díaz joined Bolivian Primera División club Bolívar. He scored 19 goals in the 2019 Bolivian Primera División and won the Torneo Apertura title.

San Marcos
On 26 November 2020, Pereyra Díaz signed for Chilean club San Marcos for the 2020 Primera B de Chile season.

Platense
On 11 February 2021, Pereyra Díaz signed for Argentine Primera División club Platense.

Kerala Blasters (loan)
On 27 August 2021, Pereyra Díaz joined Indian Super League side Kerala Blasters on a season-long loan. He made his debut on 19 November in the 2021–22 season opener against ATK Mohun Bagan FC, where he scored his debut goal but the Blasters suffered a 4–2 defeat at full-time. He scored again in the match against defending champions Mumbai City FC on 19 December, where he netted a penalty in the 51st minute as Kerala Blasters won the game 3–0 away from home. Díaz scored again in the next match against rivals Chennaiyin FC on 22 December, where he scored the opening goal of the game as the Blasters won the game with a score of 0–3. He scored his fourth goal of the season against NorthEast United FC on 4 February 2022, where he netted the opening goal of the game as Kerala Blasters won the match 2–1 at full-time. After the Blasters' match against ATK Mohun Bagan on 23 February, Díaz was shown a direct red card after being substituted. He was the charged by the All India Football Federation Disciplinary Committee for ‘violent conduct’. He was indicted for violating Article 48.1.2 of the AIFF Disciplinary Code mentioning that he 'broke the dugout panel, an act of violent conduct'. He was then given a one-game ban. Díaz was back after the one-match ban on 26 February to play against Chennaiyin, where he netted a brace as Kerala Blasters won the match 3–0 at full-time. In the Blasters' match against FC Goa on 6 March, Díaz scored another brace, which initially gave the Blasters the lead, but the match ended in a high-scoring 4–4 draw.

Mumbai City
In August 2022, Mumbai City completed the signing of Pereyra Díaz, on a one-year deal. On 18 August, he made his debut for the club against Indian Navy in the Durand Cup, which ended in a 4–1 win. He provided the assist to Vikram Pratap Singh for their equaliser. Six days later, he scored his first and the equaliser for the club against ATK Mohun Bagan, which ended in a 1–1 stalemate.

On 28 October, 2022, he scored against his former club Kerala Blasters FC  at Kochi.

Career statistics

Honours
Lanús
Copa Sudamericana: 2013

Johor Darul Ta'zim
 Malaysia Super League: 2014, 2016
 Malaysia Charity Shield: 2015, 2016, 2018
 Malaysia FA Cup: 2016

Kerala Blasters
 Indian Super League runner-up: 2021–22

Mumbai City
 Indian Super League (Premiership): 2022–23
 Durand Cup runner-up: 2022

References

External links

1990 births
Living people
Sportspeople from La Rioja Province, Argentina
Argentine footballers
Argentina international footballers
Argentine expatriate footballers
Argentine Primera División players
Primera Nacional players
Ferro Carril Oeste footballers
Club Atlético Lanús footballers
Malaysia Super League players
Johor Darul Ta'zim F.C. players
Expatriate footballers in Malaysia
Argentine expatriate sportspeople in Malaysia
Liga MX players
Club León footballers
Club Bolívar players
Expatriate footballers in Mexico
Association football forwards
Indian Super League players
Kerala Blasters FC players